Washington Township is one of the seventeen townships of Franklin County, Ohio, United States. It also includes portions of Delaware County and Union County within the city of Dublin. 

In 1991, the Supreme Court of Ohio ruled that the city of Dublin was permitted to include the entire territory of the city in Washington Township, including areas outside of Franklin County.

Geography
Located in the northwestern corner of the county, it borders the following townships and cities:
Dublin - northeast
Hilliard - southeast
Brown Township - southwest, east of Canaan Township
Canaan Township, Madison County - southwest, west of Brown Township
Darby Township, Madison County - west
Jerome Township, Union County - northwest

Several small exclaves of the township are located within the city of Dublin.

Much of eastern Washington Township is occupied by the city of Dublin, and the city of Hilliard includes a small part of southern Washington Township. As well, the unincorporated community of Amlin lies in the southwestern part of the township.

Name and history
It is one of forty-three Washington Townships statewide.

Government
The township is governed by a three-member board of trustees, who are elected in November of odd-numbered years to a four-year term beginning on the following January 1. Two are elected in the year after the presidential election and one is elected in the year before it. There is also an elected township fiscal officer, who serves a four-year term beginning on April 1 of the year after the election, which is held in November of the year before the presidential election. Vacancies in the fiscal officership or on the board of trustees are filled by the remaining trustees.

Education
Some areas of this township are in the Hilliard City School District.

Others are part of Dublin City Schools.

References

External links
Township website
County website

Townships in Delaware County, Ohio
Townships in Franklin County, Ohio
Townships in Union County, Ohio
Townships in Ohio